Dallas College Eastfield Campus (Eastfield or EFC) is a public community college campus in Mesquite, Texas. It was founded in 1970 and has an enrollment of more than 14,000 students. It is part of Dallas College.

From 1981 until 2000, the Don Ellis Library and Collection, which included his instruments and Grammy for the film The French Connection, was housed at Eastfield.

Athletics
Dallas College Eastfield Campus Harvesters compete within the Metro Athletic Conference, a National Junior College Athletic Association Division III non-scholarship conference. Sports at Dallas College Eastfield Campus include men's basketball, baseball, women's volleyball, and women's soccer. The baseball team won the NJCAA DIII championship in 2001, 2006 & 2011.

Notable alumni

Cindy Burkett, Republican member of the Texas House of Representatives from District 113 in Dallas County
Ana-Maria Ramos, Democratic member of the Texas House of Representatives from District 102 in Dallas County

References

External links
 Official website

Universities and colleges in the Dallas–Fort Worth metroplex
Universities and colleges accredited by the Southern Association of Colleges and Schools
Dallas College
Buildings and structures in Dallas County, Texas
NJCAA athletics
Two-year colleges in Texas